Ormes may refer to:

communes in France:
Ormes, Aube
Ormes, Eure
Ormes, Loiret
Ormes, Marne
Ormes, Saône-et-Loire
Ormes-et-Ville, Meurthe-et-Moselle
Les Ormes, Vienne
Les Ormes, Yonne
 collectively, the Great Orme and Little Orme, two limestone headlands in Llandudno, Wales, UK

See also
 Orme (disambiguation)
 Orm (disambiguation)
 Orme (name) 
 Orme's Law